Tú Iluminas mi Vida is the debut album by Mexican pop singer, Yuri. It was released in 1978. It was almost unheard, but her first single gained some airplay "Tú iluminas mi vida" since this is a cover of the song "You Light Up My Life" by Debby Boone. This album is considered a rarity as it is discontinued. It received promotion in the movies Milagro en el circo and En familia con Chabelo.

Track listing

Production
 Arrangements and Direction: Julio Jaramillo and Rodrigo Alvarez
 Label: Gamma records, 1978
 Backing vocals: Hermanos Zavala

Singles
 "Tú iluminas mi vida"
 "Las cosas bonitas del amor"
 "Que haremos el Domingo"
 "Espinita"

Between this album and the following one, she released 1 more single, but they were not included in any album:

1978 debut albums
Yuri (Mexican singer) albums